Michele Redman (born April 15, 1965) is an American professional golfer who played on the LPGA Tour from 1992 through 2011.  She is currently the women's golf coach at the University of Minnesota.

Redman was born in Zanesville, Ohio. She attended Zanesville High School, where she played on the varsity boys' golf team. She attended Indiana University, where she won four events, was named All-American twice and All-Big Ten four times. She was the Big Ten Conference champion in 1987.

Redman played on the Futures Tour from 1988 to 1991, winning three times in 1991.

Redman played on the LPGA Tour from 1992 through 2011 and had  two victories: the 1997 JAL Big Apple Classic and the 2000 First Union Betsy King Classic. She had her best finish on the money list in 2000, placing tenth. She was a member of the U.S. Solheim Cup team in 2000, 2002, 2003 and 2005.

Before Redman's successful fourth attempt to make the LPGA tour, she played on the Futures Tour where she posted three victories. Redman has two holes-in-one and has won over $4.5 million.

On August 10, 2011, it was announced that Redman would be the next women's golf coach at the University of Minnesota. At the 2011 Safeway Classic, Redman announced her retirement from competing on the LPGA Tour.

On November 13, 2011, Redman won the 2011 Legends Tour Open Championship.

Professional wins (8)

LPGA Tour wins (2)

LPGA Tour playoff record (0–1)

Futures Tour wins (3)
1991 Chattanooga FUTURES Classic, Marriott's Griffin Gate FUTURES Classic, Charleston F.O.P. FUTURES Golf Classic

Legends Tour wins (3)

Results in LPGA majors

^ The Women's British Open replaced the du Maurier Classic as an LPGA major in 2001.

CUT = missed the half-way cut.
"T" = tied

Summary
Starts – 70
Wins – 0
2nd-place finishes – 0
3rd-place finishes – 0
Top 3 finishes – 0
Top 5 finishes – 3
Top 10 finishes – 6
Top 25 finishes – 30
Missed cuts – 16
Most consecutive cuts made – 10
Longest streak of top-10s – 2

Team appearances
Professional
Solheim Cup (representing the United States): 2000, 2002 (winners), 2003, 2005 (winners)
Handa Cup (representing the United States): 2011 (winners), 2015 (winners)

References

External links

American female golfers
LPGA Tour golfers
Solheim Cup competitors for the United States
College golf coaches in the United States
Golfers from Ohio
Indiana University alumni
Sportspeople from Zanesville, Ohio
People from Port St. Lucie, Florida
People from Plymouth, Minnesota
1965 births
Living people
21st-century American women